The Rocca Meli Lupi, also called Rocca di Soragna, is a castle-palace located in the town of Soragna, Province of Parma, region of Emilia-Romagna, northern Italy. It has a  rough, unfinished exteriors and highly decorated interior rooms.

History
A first fortress was built here  by marquis Adalbert I of Milan in 985, who had received Soragna and Busseto by emperor Otto I. The area was acquired in the 12th century by the Pallacivino. In 1186 the castle was stormed by combined Guelph troops of Piacenza and Cremona. The lordship however was confirmed to the Pallavicino by emperor Frederick Barbarossa in 1189. A few years later, however, the Lupi acquired the castle through marriage and started a reconstruction program.

Built in 1361, the castle once belonged to the princes of the Meli Lupi family of Soragna. The castle had corner towers. In 1446, ornamental grapevine frescoes were painted in the ceilings of the courtyard portico. In 1513 the Meli inherited all the Lupi fiefs, including the castle. Further reconstructions and expansions occurred through the centuries. The castle is still inhabited by descendants of the Meli Lupi family. 

Donna Cenerina is the nickname attached to Cassandra Marinoni of Milan, wife of marquis Diofebo II Meli Lupi, who was assassinated in this castle by her brother-in-law Giulio Anguissola in 1573. Legend claims her ghost still haunts the castle.

Description
The castle has a symmetrical, roughly squared plan. At the four corners are quadrangular towers. Another, narrower tower (added in the 17th century) is located at the entrance. A moat, now waterless, protects the three frontal sides. A structure in the rear area connects a tower to the S. Croce Chapel, in turn connected at a smaller fortress, the Fortino Neogotico. The latter is accompanied by a small lake surrounded by grottoes and Baroque statues.

The main façade, in brickwork, is accessed through a small bridge build in the 17th century replace the former drawbridge. Two lions are placed at the side of the bridge's side walls. The central tower has a large window and balcony, above which is a small arch featuring the Meli Lupi coat of arms.

In the interior, some rooms are open to the public: 
Red Room, with 6 paintings by il Brescianino and portraits of the present owners Giampaolo Meli Lupi and his wife Ottavia Rossi
Antique Billiard Room, whose walls are decorated with family portraits, among them, the portrait of Donna Cinerina
Dragon stairs that go up to the second floor
Room of the Strong Women
Sala Baglione, with the Grotesque style frescoes integrating heraldic images (17th-century) done by Cesare Baglione
Golden Water Closet with the wooden ceiling (1701) by Giuseppe Bosi
Plaster Room, with the frescoed ceiling depicting the Apotheosis of the Meli-Lupi Family by Francesco and Ferdinando Galli-Bibiena
Gallery with the frescoes depicting the noble birth of the family (1696) by Francesco Galli-Bibiena, and a fresco of an Assumption by Ilario Spolverini
Gallery of the nuns with 17th-century portraits of the Farnese family.

At the centre of the castle is a porticoed courtyard with Ionic columns. The vaults of the portico have Groteque-style frescoes. Four statues at each corner complete the decoration.

The gardens of the site include a lake surrounded by grottoes and baroque statuary. The church of San Giacomo is nearby.

References

Buildings and structures completed in 1361
Houses completed in the 14th century
Castles in Emilia-Romagna
Buildings and structures in the Province of Parma
Historic house museums in Italy
Soragna